Provenzano is an Italian surname. It may refer to:

Anthony Provenzano (1917–1988), New York mobster
Bernardo Provenzano (1933–2016), member of the Sicilian Mafia
Carmen Provenzano (1942–2005), Canadian politician
Chris Provenzano, American film and television writer
Christian Provenzano, Canadian Ontario politician
Frankie Provenzano (born 1986), Italian racing driver
Giuseppe Provenzano, two people
Jim Provenzano (born 1961), American author, editor, playwright, photographer
Joseph Provenzano better known as Joe Palma (1905–1994), American film actor
Lawrence C. Provenzano, bishop of the Episcopal Diocese of Long Island
Nunzio Provenzano (1923–1997), New York mobster
Robert Provenzano, American nephrologist
Thomas Harrison Provenzano (1949–2000), American convicted murderer

Others
Paulie Provenzano, fictional character, a mutant in the Marvel Universe

Italian-language surnames